That's Them is the second studio album by American hip hop duo Artifacts. It was released by Big Beat Records in 1997. It peaked at number 134 on the Billboard 200 chart, number 3 on the Heatseekers Albums chart, and number 25 on the Top R&B/Hip-Hop Albums chart.

Track listing

Charts

References

External links
 

1997 albums
Artifacts (group) albums
Atlantic Records albums
Albums produced by Showbiz (producer)
Albums produced by Lord Finesse
Albums produced by Da Beatminerz